In the United Kingdom, a Member of Parliament (MP) is an individual elected to serve in the House of Commons of the Parliament of the United Kingdom.

Electoral system
All 650 members of the UK House of Commons are elected using the first-past-the-post voting system in single member constituencies across the whole of the United Kingdom, where each constituency has its own single representative.

Elections
All MP positions become simultaneously vacant for elections held on a five-year cycle, or when a snap election is called. The Fixed-term Parliaments Act 2011 set out that ordinary general elections are held on the first Thursday in May, every five years. The Act was repealed in 2022. With approval from Parliament, both the 2017 and 2019 general elections were held earlier than the schedule set by the Act.

If a vacancy arises at another time, due to death or resignation, then a constituency vacancy may be filled by a by-election. Under the Representation of the People Act 1981 any MP sentenced to over a year in jail automatically vacates their seat. For certain types of lesser acts of wrongdoing, the Recall of MPs Act 2015 mandates that a recall petition be opened; if signed by more than 10% of registered voters within the constituency, the seat is vacated.

Eligibility 
In the past, only male adult property owners could stand for Parliament. In 1918, women acquired the right to stand for Parliament, and to vote.

To be eligible to stand as an MP, a person must be at least 18 years old and be a citizen of the UK, a Commonwealth nation, or Ireland. A person is not required to be registered to vote, nor are there any restrictions regarding where a candidate is a resident.

The House of Commons Disqualification Act 1975 outlaws the holders of various positions from being MPs. These include civil servants, police officers, members of the armed forces, and judges. Members of the House of Lords were not permitted to hold Commons seats. However, the passing of the House of Lords Reform Act 2014 allows retired or resigned members of the House of Lords to stand or re-stand as MPs. Members of legislatures outside of the Commonwealth are excluded, with the exemption of the Irish legislature. Additionally, members of the Senedd (Welsh Parliament) or the Northern Ireland Assembly are also ineligible for the Commons according to the Wales and Northern Ireland (Miscellaneous Provisions) Acts respectively, passed in 2014.

People who are bankrupt cannot stand to be MPs. The Representation of the People Act 1981 excludes persons who are currently serving a prison sentence of a year or more. People in respect of whom a bankruptcy restrictions order has effect are disqualified from (existing) membership of the House of Commons (details differ slightly in different countries).

Members are not permitted to resign their seats. In practice, however, they always can. Should a member wish to resign from the Commons, they may request appointment to one of two ceremonial Crown offices: that of Crown Steward and Bailiff of the Chiltern Hundreds, or that of Crown Steward and Bailiff of the Manor of Northstead. These offices are sinecures (that is, they involve no actual duties); they exist solely to permit the "resignation" of members of the House of Commons. The Chancellor of the Exchequer is responsible for making the appointment, and, by convention, never refuses to do so when asked by a member who desires to leave the House of Commons.

Title
Members of Parliament are entitled to use the post-nominal initials MP. MPs are only referred to as "honourable" as a courtesy during debates in the House of Commons (e.g., "the honourable member for ..."), or if they are the children of peers below the rank of marquess ("the honourable [first name] [surname]"). Those who are members of the Privy Council use the form The Right Honourable (The Rt Hon.) Name MP.

Responsibilities

Theoretically, contemporary MPs are considered to have two duties, or three if they belong to a political party. Their primary responsibility is to act in the national interest. They must also act in the interests of their constituents, where this does not override their primary responsibility. Finally, if they belong to a political party, they may act in the interests of that party, subordinate to the other two responsibilities.

See also
 List of MPs elected in the 2019 United Kingdom general election
 United Kingdom Parliament constituencies
 Member of the Scottish Parliament
 Member of the Senedd
 Member of the Legislative Assembly (Northern Ireland)

References

External links
 

Members of Parliament